More is a civil parish in Shropshire, England.  It contains 20 listed buildings that are recorded in the National Heritage List for England.  Of these, one is listed at Grade I, the highest of the three grades, two are at Grade II*, the middle grade, and the others are at Grade II, the lowest grade.  The parish includes the villages of Linley and More, and the surrounding countryside.  The most important building in the parish is Linley Hall, a country house.  This, and associated structures, are listed.  Most of the other listed buildings are houses, cottages, farmhouses and farm buildings, the oldest of which are timber framed.  The other listed buildings include a church and a bridge.


Key

Buildings

References

Citations

Sources

Lists of buildings and structures in Shropshire